Wairoa may refer to any of these watercourses in New Zealand:

 Wairoa River (Auckland)
 Wairoa River (Bay of Plenty)
 Wairoa River (Hawke's Bay)
 Wairoa River (Northland)
 Wairoa River (Tasman)
 Wairoa Stream (Motiti Island)